NHS Professionals provides temporary clinical and non-clinical staff to the NHS. It has a national and international membership base of approximately 180,000 healthcare professionals, known as ‘Bank Members’. They work flexible shifts and longer-term placements at more than 50 NHS Trusts.

NHS Professionals was incorporated as a private limited company in 2008 and it remains wholly owned by the Department of Health and Social Care.

Its headquarters are at Breakspear Park in Hemel Hempstead, Hertfordshire, United Kingdom. It also has regional offices and Trust-based locations across England.

History
NHS Professionals was originally formed as a national staffing service in 2001 by the Department of Health in response to concerns about the cost and quality of temporary nursing staff in the NHS. Its formation also recognised that some NHS staff wish to work more flexibly.

Between 2001-2003, the NHS Professionals service was provided via four host NHS Trusts. However, to reduce variation of performance across the Trusts, the Department of Health established NHS Professionals as a Special Health Authority in 2004.

In a further reorganisation it was incorporated as a private limited company in September 2008, owned by the Department of Health. Plans to sell NHS Professionals were dropped in 2017 and the Department of Health confirmed it would remain in ‘wholly public ownership’.

While it is a publicly-owned organisation, NHS Professionals is self-funding and no longer receives financial support from the Department of Health and Social Care. It generates income from fees charged to client NHS Trusts to manage their flexible workforce requirements and to cover operating costs. It reinvests surplus annual income ‘back into the wider healthcare economy’, according to its public website.

In 2016, NHS Professionals launched two sub-divisions: Doctors Direct, a dedicated locum recruitment service, and NHS Professionals International, which recruits overseas nurses into the NHS.

Organisation and Services
NHS Professionals provides temporary clinical and non-clinical staff to the NHS. Staff are drawn from its membership base of approximately 180,000 healthcare professionals, known as Bank Members, who have previously registered with the company and meet its training and compliance criteria. NHS Professionals claims its membership base forms the largest flexible staff ‘bank’ in the NHS.

Its clinical Bank Members include nurses, midwives, healthcare support workers, doctors, allied healthcare professionals, healthcare scientists, and personal social services including care and therapy. Its non-clinical Bank Members include finance, estates and facilities, management, administration and clerical and information technology.

Bank Members comprise UK nationals and overseas staff recruited by NHS Professionals International. They work in more than 50 acute and community NHS Trusts previously registered with NHS Professionals.

NHS Professionals Bank Members work flexible shifts and longer-term temporary placements to help NHS Trusts meet short, medium and long-term workforce requirements. The company reports its Bank Members filled 36 million ‘shift’ hours across the NHS in 2018.

NHS Professionals provides a managed workforce service to some NHS Trusts, whereby in exchange for an annual fee, it assumes operational management of the Trust’s temporary workforce requirements including recruitment and shift fill, training and compliance, on-site support, communications and marketing and reductions in external staffing agency spend.

COVID-19 Response 
During the pandemic’s peak phases in 2019-2021, NHS Professionals worked with the Department of Health and Social Care and NHS England and Improvement to deliver additional healthcare workers into the NHS

In March 2020 it launched a ‘Rapid Response’ service and recruited 20,000 healthcare workers into the NHS, drawn from its Bank Members and a pool of retired, trainee and private sector staff. It also recruited 10,000 staff for the Government’s ‘Test and Trace’ programme and 17,000 people into the National Vaccination Programme in 2020/21. In addition, it recruited staff into NHS Nightingale Hospitals.

People 
NHS Professionals employs approximately 1,000 corporate staff. Nicola McQueen has been its Chief Executive Officer since 2019 and the Chairman is Stephen Collier.

References

External links
 Official website
 Companies House
 National Audit Office
 Department of Health and Social Care
 NHS England and Improvement

Department of Health and Social Care
Government-owned companies of England
National Health Service
Temporary employment agencies
Medical outsourcing